The 2022–23 Omaha Mavericks men's ice hockey season is the 25th season of play for the program and 10th in the National Collegiate Hockey Conference (NCHC). The Mavericks represent the University of Nebraska Omaha, play their home games at Baxter Arena and are coached by Mike Gabinet, in his 6th season.

Season

Departures

Recruiting

Roster
As of August 31, 2022.

Standings

Schedule and results

|-
!colspan=12 style=";" | Exhibition

|-
!colspan=12 style=";" | Regular Season

|-
!colspan=12 style=";" |

Scoring statistics

Goaltending statistics

Rankings

References

2022-23
Omaha Mavericks
Omaha Mavericks
Omaha Mavericks
Omaha Mavericks